General John Twiggs (June 5, 1750 – March 29, 1816) served as a leader in the Georgia Militia during the American Revolutionary War. Twiggs County, Georgia was named after him.

Biography
Twiggs was born in Maryland in 1750, and his family moved to St. George's Parish in Georgia in 1751. His parents' names are unknown, and his antecedents and early life are shrouded in obscurity. Unsubstantiated family history records show that he was descended from a Jamestown, Virginia settler. Biographical sketches placed him in Georgia in the 1760s accompanying the family of David Emanuel Sr., who had emigrated from Maryland, Pennsylvania, or Virginia to St. George's Parish (later Burke County). He married Ruth Emanuel, the sister of David Emanuel, who served under Twiggs in his unit and later became Governor of Georgia. Twiggs had six children with the most notable being American Civil War General David Emanuel Twiggs. Another son was USMC Major Levi Twiggs. A great-grandson of General John Twiggs was USMC Major General John Twiggs Myers holder of the Marine Corps Brevet Medal.

Twiggs served as a lieutenant in a militia company raised in St. Paul's Parish (current-day Richmond County, Georgia), and he was promoted to captain on June 3, 1774. He led a company that was commanded by Colonel Samuel Jack during the Revolution. Twiggs was later promoted to colonel, then brigadier general (August 18, 1781), and finally major general (September 8, 1791). John Twiggs led Georgia forces against both the British and the Cherokee Indians in the backcountry. He spent all of 1782 helping to drive the British out of Georgia and quell their Creek Indian allies. As a result of his efforts during this period, Twiggs became known as the "Savior of Georgia." He was wounded in a battle in Camden, South Carolina; however, he continued to serve in the military after the Revolution. After the war, he remained active on a variety of political and military fronts, statewide and in and around Augusta, including involvement in the Yazoo land fraud.

In 1783 Twiggs continued his public service with an appointment as a state Indian commissioner and concluded land cession treaties with the Creeks. He was promoted to major general of militia in 1792 and conducted an expedition against the Creeks in 1793, and led the troops that compelled the abandonment of Elijah Clarke's Trans-Oconee Republic rebellion in 1794. He was involved in the suppression of a suspected slave revolt in 1810.

Twiggs participated in the commission that selected the site for the University of Georgia in Athens, served as a trustee to that institution, and contributed money for the building of the initial UGA Chapel on its campus. He was also appointed Justice of the Peace for Burke County, Georgia in 1782 and served as a state Senator from Richmond County in 1791.

Through a series of land purchases and partly comprised confiscated Tory land that was awarded to him, Twiggs built Good Hope Plantation, which stretched over 1,500 acres throughout Richmond County and into Aiken County, South Carolina. A tobacco farmer, no records survive regarding the number of slaves Twiggs owned over his lifetime, though he left seven slaves to his wife when he died. He died at his plantation in 1816 and was buried there.

His great-granddaughter, Sarah Lowe Twiggs, was a poet.

References
 Georgia Sons of the American Revolution grave registry and bio for John Twiggs

External links
 

1750 births
1816 deaths
Georgia (U.S. state) militiamen in the American Revolution
Militia generals in the American Revolution
Georgia (U.S. state) state senators
Twiggs County, Georgia
People of Georgia (U.S. state) in the American Revolution